Zeloof may refer to:

Sam Zeloof, American electronics autodidact
Zeloof Partnership, developers involved in Black Eagle Brewery